The Mulrooney Medal is an Australian rules football award for the best and fairest player in the AFL Canberra first-grade competition. It has been the premier individual award for Australian rules football in the Australian Capital Territory since 1936. From 2011 to 2013, the medal was awarded to the best and fairest player in the Eastern Conference of the North East Australian Football League.

It was named after football administrator John L. Mulrooney, for his contribution to Australian rules football in Canberra.

Winners

*Retrospectively awarded

References

External links
AFL Canberra Summary Chart from Full Points Footy, archived from the original on 6 August 2011

Australian rules football awards
1936 establishments in Australia
Awards established in 1936
AFL Canberra